Hazardia stenolepis, the serpentine bristleweed, is a North American species of shrub in the daisy family. It has been found only in California in the western United States, and in Baja California in northwestern Mexico.

The plant produces numerous flower heads in a dense, elongated array at the top of the plant. Each head contains 8-10 disc flowers but no ray flowers. The species sometimes grows on serpentine soils.

References

Flora of Baja California
Flora of California
stenolepis
Plants described in 1928
Flora without expected TNC conservation status